Hexagenia atrocaudata is a species of common burrower mayfly in the family Ephemeridae. It is found in North America.

References

Mayflies
Insects described in 1924
Articles created by Qbugbot